Ally Rehmtullah (born 18 January 1986) is a Tanzanian fashion designer.

Early life and career
He is a fourth generation Tanzanian of Indian descent, who studied at Baum School of Art and Lehigh Valley College in the United States, before moving back to Tanzania to work as a teacher of graphic arts while gradually shifting his career to fashion design. In September 2008, he became the first East African designer to show at London Fashion Week.

References

External links 

1986 births
Living people
Tanzanian fashion designers
Aga Khan Mzizima Secondary School alumni
Tanzanian people of Indian descent